Diplocephalus subrostratus is a species of dwarf spider in the family Linyphiidae. It is found in North America, Greenland, a range from Russia (European to Far East), and Mongolia.

References

Linyphiidae
Articles created by Qbugbot
Spiders described in 1873